Dr. Mohamed Abou El-Ghar, also spelled Abul-Ghar, or Aboulghar (born 2 July 1940 in Shibin El Kom, Egypt) is an Egyptian professor of gynecology at Cairo University and a political activist.

Abou El-Ghar studied medicine at the Cairo University, and received his doctoral degree in 1969. As a doctor, he acquired prominence as Egypt's pioneer of in vitro fertilisation. During the rule of Hosni Mubarak, he founded with other professors the "March 9th Movement for the Independence of Universities" against the security control on the Egyptian universities. During the Egyptian Revolution of 2011, he demanded democratisation of Egyptian universities.

After the 2011 Egyptian revolution Abou El-Ghar founded with some Egyptian political activists, including Amr Hamzawy, and Daoud Abdel Sayed, the left liberal Egyptian Social Democratic Party. Moreover, he is a spokesman of the National Association for Change close to Mohamed ElBaradei.

He has been on the board of trustees of the Sawiris Foundation for Social Development

References

External links
 CV on his IVF center's website
 Profile on Al-Ahram Weekly On-line
 Presentation on Youm7.com

Living people
Cairo University alumni
People of the Egyptian revolution of 2011
1940 births
Members of the Egyptian Constituent Assembly of 2012
Egyptian Social Democratic Party politicians
Egyptian nationalists
Egyptian revolutionaries
Egyptian political party founders